The University of Divinity is an Australian collegiate university of specialisation in divinity. It is constituted by eleven theological colleges from eight denominations. The University of Divinity is the direct successor of the second oldest degree-granting authority in the State of Victoria, the Melbourne College of Divinity. The university's chancery and administration are located in Box Hill, a suburb of Melbourne in the state of Victoria.

The Melbourne College of Divinity was constituted in 1910 by an act of the Parliament of Victoria. The act was amended in 1956, 1972, 1979, 1990, 2005 and 2016 and is now known as the University of Divinity Act 1910 (previously the Melbourne College of Divinity Act 1910). From its beginnings the college was a self-accrediting issuer of degrees, while not becoming a university until 2011. Representatives appointed by several churches formed the college to provide tertiary level theological education. The first president was the Right Reverend Henry Lowther Clarke, Anglican Archbishop of Melbourne, and the first registrar was the Reverend John Mathew, Moderator of the Presbyterian Church of Victoria.

In 2010, the Melbourne College of Divinity applied to the Victorian Regulation and Qualifications Authority for approval to operate as a self-accrediting "Australian University of Specialisation" (a category of higher education provider). The Victorian government announced on 30 August 2011 that the application had been approved and on 1 January 2012 the college began operating as a university. Peter Sherlock was appointed the inaugural vice-chancellor in April 2012. In May 2019 TEQSA extended the seven-year licence to operate as a university for an additional three years to the maximum possible of ten years before a review.

In the 2019 Student Experience Survey, the University of Divinity recorded the highest student satisfaction rating out of every Australian university, with an overall satisfaction rating of 92.8.

Accreditations and affiliations
The University of Divinity offers awards in theology, philosophy, counselling and ministry.

In 2001 the institution was listed as a Schedule 1 Higher Education Institution by the Australian Government Department of Education, Science and Training. It receives federal funding for research, Australian Postgraduate Research Awards and International Postgraduate Research Scholarships.

The Higher Education Support Act (2003) (HESA 2003) listed the institution as a Table B (Private, Self-regulating) Higher Education Provider, which allowed its students to access federally funded loans under the FEE-HELP scheme.

The University of Divinity is the only Australian University of Specialisation listed on the National Register of Higher Education Providers maintained by TEQSA.

Publications
Pacifica, an academic journal (1988-2017)

Colleges
The colleges of the University of Divinity are:
Australian Lutheran College, Adelaide, South Australia
Eva Burrows College, in Ringwood, Victoria; Training college of the Salvation Army in Australia
Catholic Theological College, East Melbourne, Victoria. A federation of autonomous seminaries:
Corpus Christi College
St Mary's Seminary
Salesian Theological College
St Joseph of Cupertino Friary (Conventual Franciscan)
St Dominic's Priory (Dominican)
Pilgrim Theological College, Uniting Church
St Athanasius College, Donvale and Melbourne, Victoria
Trinity College Theological School (Anglican)
Wollaston College, Mount Claremont, Western Australia. Currently affiliated through a partnership agreement with Trinity College and the University of Divinity 
Uniting College of Leadership and Theology, the Uniting Church South Australia from January 2023
Whitley College, Parkville, Victoria. The Baptist theological college of Victoria.
Yarra Theological Union, Box Hill, Victoria. Comprises the following religious institutes:
Blessed Sacrament Congregation
Divine Word Missionaries
Discalced Carmelites
Franciscans (OFM)
Missionaries of the Sacred Heart
Pallottines
Passionists
Redemptorists
Wollaston College, Mt Claremont, Perth.

Past members
Morling College, Macquarie Park, New South Wales.  The Baptist theological college of New South Wales.
Stirling Theological College, Mulgrave, Victoria. The Churches of Christ national theological college.
United Faculty of Theology, Parkville. Victoria until December 2014, a co-operative venture of the Anglican, Jesuit and Uniting theological colleges.

Associated churches

In 1910
Church of England
Baptist
Congregational
Methodist
Presbyterian

Present
Anglican
Baptist
Churches of Christ
Coptic Orthodox
Lutheran
Roman Catholic
Salvation Army
Uniting Church in Australia

Libraries
Students at the university have access and borrowing rights to a number of library collections including the Mannix Library at Catholic Theological College,  Geoffery Blackburn Library at Whitley College, the Leeper and Mollison Libraries at Trinity College Theological School, as well as the Patrick Murphy Memorial Library, the Redemptorist Seminary Library, the Dominican Studium Library, the St Pashcal Library and the Sugden Collection at Queen's College.

Notable alumni and faculty
Andrew McGowan
Anne Elvey
Barbara Thiering
Cathy Ross
Charles Sherlock
Claire Renkin
Colleen O'Reilly
Dorothy Ann Lee 
Edith Amelia Kerr
Elizabeth Boase
Fiona Kumari Campbell 
Graham Hill 
Greg Homeming 
Hilda May Abba 
Janette Gray
Janina Hiebel
Joan Nowotny
Anne Pattel-Gray
Kate Prowd
Katharine Massam
Kathleen Williams
Kay Goldsworthy 
Lilian Scholes 
Marita Munro
Mark Stuart Edwards
Mary L. Coloe
Maryanne Confoy
Paul Oslington
Richard Divall 
Ruth Redpath
Sarah Macneil 
Wendy Mayer
Winifred Kiek

See also

List of universities in Australia

References

External links

Australian Lutheran College
Eva Burrows College
Catholic Theological College
Pilgrim Theological College
Jesuit College of Spirituality
St Athanasius College
Whitley College: the Baptist College of Victoria
Yarra Theological Union
Pacifica
University of Divinity Act 1910

Education in Melbourne
Educational institutions established in 1910
Seminaries and theological colleges in Australia
Universities in Victoria (Australia)
1910 establishments in Australia
 D